James Minor Quarles (February 8, 1823 – March 3, 1901) was an American politician and a member of the United States House of Representatives for Tennessee's 8th congressional district.

Biography
Quarles was born near Louisa Court House in Louisa County, Virginia, son of Garrett Minor and Mary Johnson Poindexter Quarles. He attended the common schools, and in 1833 moved to Kentucky with his father, who settled in Christian County. He completed preparatory studies, studied law, and was admitted to the bar in 1845. He commenced practice in Clarksville, Tennessee. He married Mary Walker Thomas and they had twelve children.

Career
In 1853, Quarles was elected to the tenth judicial circuit, and he served until 1859 when he resigned, having been elected to the U.S. Thirty-sixth Congress as a member of the Opposition Party. He was a U.S. Representative from March 4, 1859, to March 3, 1861.

During the Civil War, Quarles served in the Confederate Army brigade of his brother, Brigadier General William A. Quarles, until the close of the war. He then moved to Nashville, Tennessee, in 1872 and continued the practice of law. He was elected a judge of the criminal court in 1878, and he served until 1882 when he resigned and again resumed his law practice.

Death
Quarles died in Nashville and is interred at Mount Olivet Cemetery.

References

External links

1823 births
1901 deaths
People from Louisa County, Virginia
Tennessee Oppositionists
Opposition Party members of the United States House of Representatives from Tennessee
Confederate States Army officers
People of Tennessee in the American Civil War
19th-century American politicians
Members of the United States House of Representatives from Tennessee